Nakaseke is a town in Nakaseke District in the Central Region of Uganda. It is the main municipal and commercial center of the district. However, the political and administrative capital in the district is Butalangu.

Location
The coordinates of the town are 0°43'48.0"N, 32°24'54.0"E (Latitude:0.7300; Longitude:32.4150).

Overview
Nakaseke Town Council was carved out of Nakaseke sub-county and was demarcated in 2010. The town, in its early years, faces challenges related to physical planning.

Most of the people in Nakaseke are Baganda, the largest ethnic group in the Central Region. An estimated 59.2 percent of the Nakaseke community is literate, which is largely limited to the Luganda language. A Primary Teachers' Training College has been built in Nakaseke. Nakaseke Hospital, a 120-bed public hospital owned by the Uganda Ministry of Health, is in Nakaseke town. The hospital is administered by the Nakaseke District Local Government The hospital is connected to other health units by a radio. The government of Uganda plans to build an industrial park in Nakaseke.

Population
During the national census and household survey of 27 and 28 August 2014, the Uganda Bureau of Statistics (UBOS), enumerated the population of Nakaseke at 7,238 people.

In 2015, UBOS estimated the population of Nakaseke Town at 7,400. In 2020, the population agency estimated the mid-year population of the town at 8,600. UBOS calculated the rate of population growth of Nakaseke Town to average 3.05 percent annually, between 2015 and 2020.

See also
 List of cities and towns in Uganda
 Luweero Triangle

References

External links
Google Map of Nakaseke with coordinates

Populated places in Central Region, Uganda
Cities in the Great Rift Valley
Nakaseke District